Abdülkadir "Demirkan" Pirhasan (13 May 1919 – 29 August 2016), known by his pen name as Vedat Türkali, was a Turkish screenwriter, novelist, playwright, intellectual, teacher and the member of the Democratic People's Party. He is also credited to "film director" for making three films in Turkish cinema as a director. He was the recipient of numerous accolades, including International Antalya Film Festival  Best Screenplay for Karanlıkta Uyananlar (Those Who Wake in the Darkness) film.

At the age of 21, he married Merih Pirhasan in 1942, with whom he had two children: Barış Pirhasan and Deniz Türkali. An Italian-Turkish singer namely Zeynep Casalini is his granddaughter.

Türkali wrote more than forty screenplays, four theater plays, and eight novels throughout his career since 1958. His novels, including Bir Gün Tek Başına (One Day Alone) and Mavi Karanlık (Blue Darkness) appears in prominent literary works in modern Turkish literature. The year 2004 was artistically referred to as the "Year of Vedat Türkali" by the different people such as writers, artists, human rights defenders, and other people associated with or working in related fields.

He is often recognized one of the greatest writers in the history of Turkish literature. He was detained fifty one times over his controversial writings and political movements carried out with the Communist Party of Turkey.

Early life
Türkali was born as Abdülkadir Demirkan on 13 May 1919 in Samsun city of Turkey (formerly Ottoman Empire). His surname "Demirkan" was replaced with "Pirhasan" by a court order in 1950. He completed his secondary schooling from a school in Samsun city, and later in 1942 he attended Istanbul University where he graduated in Turkology (in languages and literature). After completing his education, he then worked as a teacher of literature at Kuleli Military High School and at Turkish Military Academy in Ankara.

In 1951 or earlier, he served in Turkish Land Forces as a military officer, but was dismissed over political issues. Later a military court found him guilty in carrying out political movements against government and for writing on prolonged political issues. The court later sent him to jail and sentenced to nine years. After spending seven years in a Turkish prison, he was released in 1958 under the certain constitutional rules. He was charged multiple times following the 1980 Turkish coup d'état, and later went to London and lived there for over one year between 1989 and 1999. Later, he joined an old daily newspaper of Turkey Cumhuriyet and served as an editor. He was subsequently removed from the job over writing an anonymous novel under "Hüsamettin Gönenli" name criticising the newspaper owner Yunus Nadi Abalıoğlu. The novel was originally written at his publishing company Gar Publications co-founded by him and a Turkish teacher Rıfat Ilgaz.

Career
Türkali primarily wrote about different aspects of issues, ethnic and minority groups, including Hamidiyes, Armenians, Kurds, social issues, Turkish politics and literature. He covered Armenian genocide in his writings, making him the first novelist in the history of Turkish literature who wrote about the conflicts involving Armenians and Turkish. He started his career between 1958 and 1960 as a screenwriter with Dolandırıcılar Şahı film directed by Atıf Yılmaz. In 1964 he wrote script for Karanlıkta Uyananlar (Those Who Wake in the Darkness) film that became his one of the prominent works. The film was awarded at the 2nd Antalya Golden Orange Film Festival for Best Script. A Turkish television drama titled Fatmagül'ün Suçu Ne? (What is Fatmagül's crime?) is also credited to his writings as its episodes are based on one of his novels. The drama was criticised by the censorship committee citing "a Turkish man does not marry the girl raped by others". Türkali covered 1960 Turkish coup d'état in his first-ever cinematographic novel titled Bir Gün Tek Başına (One Day Alone), which was published in 1974. He also served as a director and member at Turkish Authors' Association or at Turkish Authors' Association.

Work

Political activities
In 2002 Türkali established his political associations with the Communist Party of Turkey and later Democratic People's Party. While with Democratic's party he participated in the 2002 Turkish general election as a candidate but lost. He was actively involved in politics and choose to become a communist after reading proclaimed-controversial publications at the Gazi Husrev-beg Library. The police raided his friend's house and detained his friend Haig Açıkgöz and started interrogating about Türkali's presence. He was allegedly tortured by the local police over not naming him. Later, he started working secretly outside for Kurdish movement, while Haig Açıkgöz along with his wife Merih established a hideout to escape from arrests. He was actively supported by his vedats such as Behice Boran, Muzaffer Şerif, Haig and Mihri Belli. Türkali escaped several times from arrests and was ultimately detained in 1951.

Awards

Death
Türkali was suffering from chronic conditions and was subsequently admitted to Yalova Public Hospital for medical treatment. He died in Yalova on 29 August 2016 of multiple organ dysfunction. He is buried in Zincirlikuyu Cemetery where his wife Merih Pirhasan is buried. She died in November 2013.

Funeral
His funeral was attended by the numerous people, leading the local police to use tear gas to prevent procession marched from Teşvikiye Mosque to Zincirlikuyu Cemetery. It is claimed funeral attendees used "Friendship among peoples" and "Peace right now" slogans during the procession, while some people marched holding cover photos of the poems and novels written by Türkali.

Bibliography

References

Notes

External links 
 

1919 births
2016 deaths
People from Samsun Province
Istanbul University alumni
Turkish male screenwriters
Turkish dramatists and playwrights
Turkish male writers
Turkish novelists
20th-century Turkish writers